Neha Dubey also known by her stage name Neha Sargam is an Indian actress and singer. Known for her participation on Indian Idol 4 and her shows like Chand Chupa Badal Mein on Star Plus,  Ramayan on Zee TV,  Mahabharat on Star Plus, Doli Armano Ki on Zee TV,  Mirzapur and theatre musical Mughal-E-Azam (musical)

Career 

Neha had auditioned in Indian Idol 2, but she forgot the lyrics in the second audition and was rejected. Neha had appeared in Indian Idol 4 in 2009. She appears in the cast for Chand Chupa Badal Mein, as well as  Ramayan as Sita.
She played the part of Lakshmi in Paramavatar Shri Krishna. She has also worked in the serials, she did a cameo in Punar Vivaah - Zindagi Milegi Dobara and Doli Armaano Ki, as main lead post leap as Diya Iss Pyaar Ko Kya Naam Doon? Ek Baar Phir, and Yeh Hai Aashiqui. 
Neha Sargam has been a part of 2 musical plays as actor and singer in the lead Mughal-E-Azam the musical directed by Feroz Abbas Khan,  produced by Shapoorji Pallonji Group. and Raunaq and Jassi musical produced by BookMyShow and directed by Feroz Abbas Khan.

Web series 
In 2020 she played the role of Saloni Tyagi in  Mirzapur season 2.

Filmography

Television

Web series

References

External links 
 

Year of birth missing (living people)
Living people
Actresses from Patna
Indian television actresses